Darius Stills (born May 1, 1998) is an American football defensive tackle for the Birmingham Stallions of the United States Football League (USFL). He played college football at West Virginia.

Early years
Stills attended Fairmont Senior High School in Fairmont, West Virginia. During his career, Stills had 191 tackles and 44 tackles for loss. He committed to West Virginia University to play college football.

College career
Stills played in 21 total games his first two years at West Virginia, recording 13 tackles and one sack. He became a starter his junior year in 2019 and recorded 46 tackles and seven sacks. Prior to his senior season, Stills was selected the Big 12 Preseason Defensive Player of the Year.

Professional career

Las Vegas Raiders
Stills signed with the Las Vegas Raiders as an undrafted free agent on May 7, 2021. He was waived/injured on August 24, 2021 and placed on injured reserve. He was released on August 26.

Kansas City Chiefs
On January 11, 2022, Stills signed a reserve/future contract with the Kansas City Chiefs. He was waived on May 10, 2022.

Birmingham Stallions
Stills signed with the Birmingham Stallions of the USFL on November 22, 2022.

Personal life
Several of Stills family members played in the NFL and Division I football. His brother Dante, plays defensive line at West Virginia. Their father, Gary, played in the NFL for 10 years and also played for the Chiefs. Stills uncle, Ken, and cousin, Kenny also played in the NFL.

References

External links
West Virginia Mountaineers bio

1998 births
Living people
African-American players of American football
Sportspeople from Fairmont, West Virginia
Players of American football from West Virginia
American football defensive tackles
West Virginia Mountaineers football players
All-American college football players
Las Vegas Raiders players
21st-century African-American sportspeople
Fairmont Senior High School alumni
Kansas City Chiefs players
Birmingham Stallions (2022) players